The Minister of Finance is one of the Finnish Government's ministers. The Minister of Finance is responsible for maintaining Finland's fiscal policies and oversees the Ministry of Finance. The Marin Cabinet's incumbent Minister of Finance is Annika Saarikko.

List of Ministers of Finance

External links
Ministry of Finance

References

-
Finance